Adrian Popescu  (born 25 June 1975) is a Romanian professional footballer who played for Pandurii Târgu Jiu in the Romanian Liga I. He made 31 league appearances for the club in the 2006–07 season, scoring two goals.

References

1975 births
Living people
Romanian footballers
Liga I players
CS Minerul Motru players
CS Pandurii Târgu Jiu players
Association football forwards